Before the Dawn Heals Us is the third studio album by the French electronic group M83, released in January 2005 to positive reviews. The album was released on the Gooom label in Europe and on the Mute label in the United States. It was the first album from M83 following the departure of founding member Nicolas Fromageau. Before the Dawn Heals Us was also chosen as one of Amazon.com's Top 100 Editor's Picks of 2005.

The track "Moon Child" was featured in the television show Top Gear in episode 6 of series 6 in 2005. The track "Teen Angst" was featured in trailers to the 2006 film A Scanner Darkly. The track "Lower Your Eyelids to Die with the Sun" was featured in the 2008 documentary Britney: For the Record, and also featured as the backing track for the intro sequence to Lakai’s 2007 full-length skateboarding film Fully Flared.  The track "I Guess I'm Floating" was featured in the movie Broken English. It was also featured in and on the soundtrack of the movie Like Crazy. The track "Asterisk" was used in a 2011 Red Bull advertisement featuring snowboarder Travis Rice. It was also used in Gabe Morford and Mike Martin's 2006 urban track bike riding manifesto MASH SF.

The city skyline featured on the album cover is Bangkok, Thailand.

As of 2005 the album has shipped over 30,000 copies to record stores in the United States.

Track listing

Singles
"A Guitar and a Heart"/"Safe" (22 November 2004)
 "A Guitar and a Heart"
 "Safe"
"Don't Save Us from the Flames" (7 February 2005)
 "Don't Save Us from the Flames"
 "Until the Night Is Over"
 "Don't Save Us from the Flames" (Superpitcher Remix)
 "Don't Save Us from the Flames" (Boom Bip Remix)
"Teen Angst" (6 May 2005)
 "Teen Angst"
 "Teen Angst" (Montag Remix)

Charts

Release history

References

2005 albums
M83 (band) albums
Mute Records albums